The 1954 Cork Intermediate Hurling Championship was the 45th staging of the Cork Intermediate Hurling Championship since its establishment by the Cork County Board in 1909.

Glen Rovers won the championship following a 4-07 to 4-02 defeat of Ballymartle in the final. This was their second championship title overall and their first title since 1925.

References

Cork Intermediate Hurling Championship
Cork Intermediate Hurling Championship